The Balochistan Liberation United Front (BLUF) is a Baloch nationalist Indian Supported militant organization in Pakistan. It first became known for claiming the kidnapping of American UNHCR worker John Solecki from Quetta on February 2, 2009. The BLUF demanded the release of thousands of Baloch nationalist prisoners it claimed were being held by the Pakistani government in Baloch insurgency. The group eventually released Solecki on April 4, 2009, on humanitarian grounds without any of its demands being met. BLUF also claimed the responsibility for a targeted attack on October 25, 2009 that killed Shafiq Ahmed Khan, the education minister of the Balochistan province.

References

Organisations designated as terrorist by Pakistan
Baloch nationalist militant groups
Rebel groups in Pakistan
Balochistan
Paramilitary organisations based in Pakistan
Separatism in Pakistan
Terrorism in Pakistan